Philip K. Dick's Electric Dreams, or simply Electric Dreams, is a science fiction television anthology series based on the works of Philip K. Dick. The series consists of ten standalone 50-minute episodes based on Dick's work, written by British and American writers. It premiered on Channel 4 in the United Kingdom on 17 September 2017, and in the United States on Amazon Prime Video on 12 January 2018.

Production

Development
The series was initially planned to run on AMC and Channel 4, before AMC pulled out, leading Channel 4 to announce the series. In February 2017, it was announced that Amazon Video had bought the U.S. rights to the series.

The series is produced by Sony Pictures Television with Ronald D. Moore, Michael Dinner, and Bryan Cranston serving as executive producers. Cranston also stars in one of the episodes. The episode writers include Ronald D. Moore, Michael Dinner, Tony Grisoni, Jack Thorne, Matthew Graham, David Farr, Dee Rees, and Travis Beacham. Jack Thorne wrote the teleplay for "The Commuter", based on the short story of the same name, with Tom Harper directing the episode.

Casting
In March 2017, Timothy Spall joined the episode "The Commuter", starring opposite Anthony Boyle and Tuppence Middleton. The following month, Jack Reynor and Benedict Wong were cast to lead the episode "Impossible Planet", alongside a supporting cast including Geraldine Chaplin and Georgina Campbell. Also in April, Steve Buscemi was cast in "Crazy Diamond", and Greg Kinnear and Mireille Enos joined the episode "The Father Thing".

On 3 May 2017, Anna Paquin and Terrence Howard were cast in the episode "Real Life", with a supporting cast including Rachelle Lefevre, Jacob Vargas, Sam Witwer, Guy Burnet and Lara Pulver. Also in May, Richard Madden and Holliday Grainger were announced to star in "The Hood Maker". Later that month, Vera Farmiga and Mel Rodriguez were cast to lead the episode "Kill All Others", with Jason Mitchell, Glenn Morshower and Sarah Baker also appearing. Finally in May, Janelle Monáe and Juno Temple joined the cast of the episode "Autofac" alongside Jay Paulson and David Lyons.

In June 2017, Maura Tierney and Annalise Basso were cast to star in "Safe and Sound", and Bryan Cranston was confirmed to appear in the episode "Human Is" with Essie Davis, Liam Cunningham and Ruth Bradley.

Filming
Five episodes were filmed in England and five were filmed in Chicago.

The fourth episode of the series, "Crazy Diamond", filmed in two locations in Kent, England; the Dungeness estate was used for various exterior settings and driving scenes, and the Cheyne Court wind farm was used as the checkpoint Sally passes on her way in and out of the estate.

Music
Harry Gregson-Williams was hired to compose the main titles theme music and score an episode, and Ólafur Arnalds and Cristobal Tapia de Veer were also hired to score multiple episodes each. Brian Transeau and Mark Isham scored music for the episode titled "Autofac", while Bear McCreary scored music for three episodes in the first season.

Sequels
Amazon intended the production as a limited series. Some sources say Sony TV is attempting to find a new home for the drama.

Episodes
Each episode is based on a short story by Dick. The episode sequences are different on Channel 4 and Amazon Video.

Reception
On review aggregation website Rotten Tomatoes, the series has an approval rating of 73% based on reviews from 52 critics, with an average rating of 6.06/10. The site's critical consensus reads, "Electric Dreamss dreamy production values and optimistic tone help make up for a lack of originality and tonal cohesion – and save the show from feeling like just another Black Mirror clone." Metacritic assigned the first season a weighted average score of 68 out of 100, based on 16 critics, indicating "generally favorable reviews".

Accolades

Broadcast
The series was greenlit for production by Channel 4 in the UK and Amazon Video in the United States. The first six episodes were screened weekly on Channel 4 in 2017, with the rest premiering on 12 January 2018 on Amazon, when the entire season was released on Amazon Streaming worldwide (except UK, Canada and Australia). On Amazon, the episode order is sequenced differently from the UK broadcast. Electric Dreams was broadcast on Space in Canada, and on the streaming service Stan in Australia.

References

External links
 

2010s American science fiction television series
2010s British science fiction television series
2017 British television series debuts
2018 British television series endings
Amazon Prime Video original programming
2010s British anthology television series
British science fiction television shows
Channel 4 television dramas
Dystopian television series
English-language television shows
Science fiction anthology television series
Television shows based on works by Philip K. Dick
Television series by Anonymous Content
Television series by Amazon Studios
Television series by Left Bank Pictures
Television series by Sony Pictures Television